Mikhail Ivanovich Scotti or Michele Pietro Scotti (Russian: Михаил Иванович Скотти; 29 October 1814, Saint Petersburg - 11 March 1861, Paris) was a Russian historian, portrait and religious painter of Italian ancestry.

Biography

His father was the decorative painter,  (originally, Giovanni Battista Scotti), who was probably born in Northern Italy and brought to Russia at the age of ten by his father, also a painter, who was invited there by Giacomo Quarenghi.

He received his primary education at Saint Catherine's Catholic school. After his father's death, he was adopted and raised by the artist, Alexei Yegorov, who had himself been an orphan. He also audited classes at the Imperial Academy of Arts, and was awarded a silver medal for drawing from life. He graduated with a gold medal in 1835. For a time, he worked on the  estate, near Ardatov, giving drawing lessons and painting icons.

Shortly after, he went to Italy, by way of Germany with Count Pavel Kutaisov, chairman of the Imperial Society for the Encouragement of the Arts, and remained there until 1844. That year, he painted icons for the Russian Orthodox chapel at the embassy in Istanbul. In 1845, he created another series of icons for Saviour Cathedral in Nizhny Novgorod, for which he was awarded the title of "Academician".

After 1849, he went to Moscow to replace  as a teacher and inspector at the Moscow School of Painting, Sculpture and Architecture. His students there included Konstantin Makovsky, Nikolai Nevrev, Vasily Perov and Sergei Gribkov. He also continued to paint numerous religious works; notably at the Annunciation Church in Saint Petersburg, under the direction of its designer, Konstantin Thon.

In 1857, he began to travel, visiting Italy, Spain and France. He died in Paris after a brief, sudden illness and was buried at the Montmartre Cemetery.

Works

References

External links 

"I tried to improve myself ...", the painter Mikhail Scotti, by Lyudmila Markina @ Наше Наследие (Our Heritage)
"Flowers for the Madonna. On the bicentenary of Mikhail Scotti's birth" from the Tretyakov Gallery magazine.

19th-century painters from the Russian Empire
Russian male painters
Russian people of Italian descent
Painters from Saint Petersburg
1812 births
1861 deaths
Russian genre painters
Russian portrait painters
Religious artists
Burials at Père Lachaise Cemetery
19th-century male artists from the Russian Empire
Academic staff of the Moscow School of Painting, Sculpture and Architecture